Traywick is a surname of Cornish origin. Notable people with the surname include:

Aaron Traywick (1989-2018), American businessman and life extension activist
Randy Traywick (born 1959), better known as Randy Travis, American country music and gospel music singer

See also
Trawick
Trewick
Treweek